Seek and Destroy, known in Japan as , is an action game for the PlayStation 2 released by Takara Co Ltd and published and licensed by Play it Ltd. It is a 1-2 player vehicular combat game, with over 100 tanks and over 100 upgrades to choose from. It Involves upgrading and customizing your tank to progress through the game and meet the specific needs of the mission/map,(including optional mini-games).

Story 
In the world of Quewar, three nations held power over all others: the powerful and militaristic Q-Stein Empire, the seafaring and peaceful Kingdom of Nibelia, and the economically powerful and benevolent Proton Kingdom. In August 210, the Q-Stein Empire declared war and started a campaign of world conquest. With its powerful military and effective blitz tactics, the Empire conquered surrounding nations one after another without giving them a chance to fight back.  The Q-Stein Empire soon expanded its invasion to the Proton Kingdom. The military power of the Proton Kingdom wasn't as great as that of the Q-Stein Empire.  However, due to their well-organized and controlled government, they were ready to respond to Q-Stein's declaration of war.  In November 210, the Q-Stein Empire started their invasion of the Proton Kingdom and won a first decisive battle.  To match Q-Stein military power, the Proton Kingdom organized a partisan group as a support unit for the regular army.  The power of the two sides equalized, showing signs of a long war. However, in March 211, the Proton forces weakened and began to retreat south. Q-Stein troops forced the Proton King to flee the capital and go into hiding. In spite of them holding only twenty percent of their territory, the Proton troops never give up on hope.

The game starts with the player as a rookie under the command of Major Rodeschild, who is in command of a small unit of Proton soldiers defending the town of Rivageders from rapidly advancing Q-Stein forces under the command of Colonel Hoffman, a Brummbär self-propelled heavy assault gun with a bounce bomb launcher. Upon entering the town, Hoffmann destroys the Rivageders Clock Tower in a single shot. Rodeschild refuses to allow another retreat and commands that the line be held at Rivageders. The player and Rodeschild's other troops are tasked with destroying Hoffman's unit of Marder II tank destroyers. Hoffman can either be killed by the player or be allowed to live. If spared, he will call a retreat when enough of his troops have been killed. After Rivageders is free of Q-Stein forces, Major Rodeschild orders a quick response force be deployed to assist the Proton Civilian Resistance under heavy fire northeast of the town. The player is transported via Proton Huey dropships to the position of the resistance leader Jevons, who is barely holding on with just two troops left. The player and his allies quickly dispatch the attacking Q-Steins and the wave of reinforcements. If Colonel Hoffman was spared in the previous level, he must be killed in this one. Upon reaching victory, the player is given an option of which level to take next: go with the resistance to rescue Proton Army Lieutenant General Ahmadi from a flatbed truck transporting him to the brutal Q-Stein prison Camp Hascallasa, or equip himself with night operations kit and join Major Rodeschild for a stealthy night liberation of the capital city of the Proton Kingdom, Bacherit. Before choosing, however, the player can do a side mission set in a desert oasis; the oasis has been occupied by Q-Stein troops under the command of Captain Bergstrom, a Tiger II (Porsche turret) tank with a long-range cannon. The player must kill all Q-Stein troops, including Bergstrom.

If the player chooses Jevons' option, he joins Jevons and the other resistance fighters in a razed forest that Ahmadi's prison transport is passing through. The truck is too heavily armoured to be destroyed with weapons fire, so Jevons directs the player to destroy a bridge over a river that the truck must pass over to cease its movement. If the player chooses Rodeschild's option, he must sneak through the streets of Bacherit at night avoiding Q-Stein patrols to reach the royal palace and declare liberation. If the player chooses Rodeschild's choice, he must then rescue Ahmadi from his cell at Camp Hascallasa in the seaside artisan town of Tughl. Jevons and his men have eliminated the outer defences, but suffered great damage in the process, so the player must go in the camp and find Ahmadi's cell alone. If the player sides with Jevons, the liberation of Bacherit is delayed by an assault on the industrial city of Naldnick. Major Rodeschild tasks the player with destroying four radio towers to prevent the Q-Stein forces calling for reinforcements before four minutes are elapsed. Upon the destruction of the towers, a Q-Stein base built into a mountain deploys a large weapon on a guard carrier and covered with mesh. Rodeschild tasks the player with following it out of the city. The player finds it in a field some ways away. If the player chose Jevons' mission, the guard carrier will be destroyed by a giant Q-Stein helicopter named Sergeant Matthews armed with bounce bomb and rocket launchers and a cannon, revealing it to be a lure to trap the player. If the player chose Rodeschild's mission, the weapon will be revealed to be a giant hovering spider tank armed with rockets, tesla cannons, and laser cannons. Regardless of which is fought, the player will return upon defeating it and will be tasked with the next mission: the liberation of Bacherit.

Upon arrival at Bacherit, the player finds himself under the command of Ahmadi and Jevons, leading a joint military-partisan liberation of the capital. The Protons destroy the Q-Steins in the city and raze the Q-Stein headquarters constructed at the former royal palace. Once Bacherit is liberated, a Proton tank delivers frantic news that the Proton King's hideout has been discovered and is under attack. The player is dispatched to defend the hideout until Proton reinforcements can arrive. The player, Jevons, and a handful of Proton troops defend against waves of Q-Stein tank destroyers until Ahmadi and Rodeschild arrive leading a massive army of Proton troops. The Q-Steins retreat and the player, Jevons, Rodeschild, and Ahmadi confer with the King to plan the next offensive. The player is now assigned to Major Rodeschild's army to liberate the heavily defended and damaged port town of Zambneal. In the fields outside of Zambneal, the Proton troops clash with forces under the command of Germinaro, a foul-tempered Sturmtiger heavy assault gun armed with a heat-seeking missile launcher. Heavy casualties are suffered, but the Protons break through the Q-Stein lines and kill Germinaro and his elite guards. Upon the liberation of the ruined town, Jevons reports Q-Stein activity in the frigid north, prompting Ahmadi and Jevons to give the player his own troops to command and stop the Q-Steins. The player and his forces head north and soon encounter Q-Stein special forces troops under the command of Lieutenant Commander Yugos, a Leclerc armed with a heat-seeking missile launcher. Yugos and his convoy are swiftly ambushed and dispatched. The player then goes on alone to a secret Q-Stein base in Kierok Cave further north. Equipped with night gear, the player storms the base and kills the guards. The base is revealed to be a Q-Stein lab producing high-tech upgraded tank parts. The player steals the blueprints and attempts to leave, only to be stopped by the lab's guardian, Secondary Lieutenant Trenios, a six-wheeled armoured personnel carrier with a tank gun who moves with incredible speed. The player kills Trenios and heads back to Zambneal, only to be stopped by electrical beams forming an arena. An enormous experimental Q-Stein tank armed with tornado generators and a mine flail confronts the player, but it is destroyed.

In Zambneal, the player is told by Major Rodeschild that the next stop is the Proton Kingdom's island neighbour of Nibelia, under blockade by the Q-Stein Navy. The player is ordered to equip himself with ocean drive gears in order to escort the troop carriers through to Nibelia. En route to Nibelia, the Protons are greeted by a mass of Q-Stein destroyers, aircraft carriers, attack jets, and torpedo helicopters. A fierce battle is fought, but the Q-Steins are defeated and Nibelia is liberated. In Nibelia, the player is personally thanked by the Nibelian King himself, and Major Rodeschild gives his congratulations. The player is then given the mission of clearing the way for an invasion of the Q-Stein Empire itself. Still equipped with ocean drive, the player goes to fight the only thing standing in the way of a seaborne invasion: General Skiseava, a massive battleship armed with gun turrets, a CIWS turret, ICBMs, and missile launchers. After killing Skiseava, the way is clear for an invasion.

The player can now choose to attack first either the eastern town of Magscopic or the western town of Gloonstat. If the Magscopic mission is chosen, the player storms the headquarters of the Q-Stein Air Force and encounters the air force's director, Marshal Volzol, a Leopard 2 tank with heat-seeking missiles. Volzol traps the player on the runway of the airfield and fights the player alongside his crack unit of elite soldiers. If the Gloonstat mission is chosen, the Protons and the Nibelians launch a surprise night attack on the important Q-Stein port city of Gloonstat, where the remainder of the Q-Stein Navy is anchored. Under the cover of an aerial attack by Nibelian Heinkel 111 bombers, the player and a few crack Proton troops sneak in and silence the garrison in the rubble of the bombed-out city. Once Gloonstat is secured, the player has three options on where to go next: Magscopic, the desert, or the Iron Fortress. In the Iron Fortress mission, the player is spotted by Q-Stein patrols around the Iron Fortress, a huge fort with powerful gun turrets and a factory inside that must be destroyed. The player has only a few minutes to get inside and take out the factory before the Q-Stein Air Force levels the area. In the desert mission, the player, Nibelian Captain Boane, and Major Rodeschild are ambushed by Q-Stein special forces fighters hidden in the sand. If the player chose the Gloonstat mission first, Major Rodeschild and Captain Boane accompany the player to Magscopic, just in time to see Volzol launch a prototype bomber codenamed Calceoria off of the runway and towards the Proton Kingdom. Rodeschild equips the player with an experimental flight pack in order to chase and destroy Calceoria before it can destroy the Proton homeland. Although Calceoria is armed with defensive lasers and missiles, the player manages to shoot it down.

With the south of the Q-Stein Empire secured, the player, Captain Boane, and Major Rodeschild lead a huge offensive against a major Q-Stein defensive line of bunkers and fortifications. Albeit under heavy air and ground attack, the Protons and Nibelians punch through. Major Rodeschild is informed that contact has been lost with Ahmadi and sends the player to investigate. The player can choose to investigate or proceed to the capital. If they decide to investigate, the player arrives at a beach surrounded by cliffs to find Ahmadi dead and half buried in the sand with the remainder of his troops shooting at a huge three-wheeled Q-Stein tank with a fire bomb launcher, an ice cannon, and two main guns; this is the second-in-command of the Q-Stein Empire. The player defeats the tank in a one-on-one duel and reports Ahmadi's death. If the player chose to not investigate Ahmadi's situation, they will arrive in the capital alone and proceed to launch a one tank assault on the Q-Stein Capital. If they investigated Ahmadi before attacking the capital, then Jevons, Boane, Rodeschild, and the player launch a final offensive on the capital of the Q-Stein Empire. After furious street fighting with the elite guard of the Q-Stein Emperor, the player infiltrates the palace alone and faces the Q-Stein Emperor, a massive tank with a mortar launcher and seven turrets. Upon defeating it the first time, the Emperor then shifts into a floating spider tank with three main guns. Upon the second defeat, the Emperor turns into a giant cogwheel monster that sends giant cog wheels after the player. Once the Emperor is defeated a third time, he explodes and the world celebrates the end of the war.

Characters 
There are many characters in Seek and Destroy, some of main ones are:

Major Rodeschild — first commanding tank found. He is a M1A1 Abrams battle tank (blue with one main white stripe).  He serves as the player's commanding officer for the entirety of the game.  In the story he plans an invasion with the other commanders. Also, for some reason, he appears to act as if he were equal in rank to Ahmadi.

Jevons — the second commanding tank found.  He is a dark green LVTP-7 with white stripes, and leads the Proton Civilian Resistance. He is somewhat accident prone, as seen at the end of the mission "Battle of Zambneal," when he accidentally runs over an unexploded land mine.

Lieutenant General Ahmadi — the third commanding tank found.  He has the same colour scheme as Major Rodeschild, but is a Chieftain tank with a slightly bluer tint than Rodeschild. Late in the story, he and the other commanders plan an invasion on the Q-Stein Empire.  He is found by the player in the next-to-last level "After the Dust Clears", killed by an enormous three-wheeled Q-Stein tank.

Captain Boane - the fourth and final commanding tank found. He is the only named Nibelian character in the game; he is royally appointed by the King of Nibelia to command all Nibelian forces invading the Q-Stein Empire alongside the Protons. He is an Israeli Merkava III tank, and accompanies the player in all but two missions after "The Battle of Nibelia" .

The Proton King — seen a few times throughout the game.  The mission "Defend!" consists of the player defending the king's hideout from seemingly countless Q-Stein forces.  The king is an M24 Chaffee tank, and is white and gold in colour, mostly white with gold stars and stripes.

The King of Nibelia — similar to the Proton King, but is pink and blue in colour. He is a Sherman Firefly.

The Q-Stein Emperor — the main antagonist of the game. He is the final boss that must be defeated to win the game. He has 3 Stages:
 Normal: A large pink/purple/black tank with multiple guns, which turn into legs for the spider form, as described below.
 Spider: A large pink/purple/black spider tank. which upon its destruction becomes the final stage below.
 Final: A cogwheel monster with an energy emission.

Factions 
There are 3 factions in Seek and Destroy.
 The Q-Stein Empire is portrayed as the "evil" faction, and an empire with great military power.  They invade a number of other nations (including Nibelia and the Proton Kingdom).  The basic colour code for most of their units is black, dark purple, and a red "Q" as flag. Their force is composed primarily of German and Russian tanks; their elite units and field officers sport the Q-Stein insignia on their armour.
 The Proton Kingdom is portrayed as the "good" faction.  The player is a member of this faction.  The basic colour code for most of their units is white and light blue, with what is thought to be a white eagle against a light blue background.  Although the Proton Kingdom's military might isn't great as the Q-stein Empire's, their government is stated to be well organized and was able to swiftly respond to the initial declaration of war presumably sparing them from the destruction wrought on the other nations. Their forces are formed mostly of American and British tanks, excluding the player's tank unless otherwise selected.
 Nibelia is an island nation that is allied with the Proton Kingdom. Nibelia was blockaded by Q-Stein forces, but the blockade was broken by liberation troops from the Proton Kingdom.  Their military might isn't strong compare to Proton's and Q-stein's military, but they fight just as fiercely; they also have a small air force (curiously composed of Heinkel 111 bombers), as seen in the mission "Flash of Explosion." Most of their tanks are of British origin, but there are a few of miscellaneous origins. For example, their military leader, Captain Boane, is an Israeli Merkava III.

Game modes 
Main/Story Mode: The main course of the game
Battle Arena: Battle other tanks in special arenas and win the tanks that are defeated
Expert Arena: A series of challenge courses that test your skills at commanding your tank or a specific piece of equipment (water races and bomb survival).
Multiplayer mode: For more than one player, features Battle Arena and Expert Arena, it is possible to unlock passwords to use in Rivendall by speaking to the multicoloured tank.

Reception 

The game received "mixed" reviews according to the review aggregation website Metacritic. In Japan, Famitsu gave it a score of two sevens, one six, and one seven for a total of 27 out of 40.

References

External links 
 

2002 video games
PlayStation 2 games
PlayStation Network games
Takara video games
Video games developed in Japan
Video games based on Takara Tomy toys
Multiplayer and single-player video games
Conspiracy Entertainment games
Barnhouse Effect games